Rooth is an unincorporated community and railway point in the Canadian province of New Brunswick in York County,  east of Cork Station.

Transportation
New Brunswick Route 645 and the New Brunswick Southern Railway both pass through Rooth. A post office named Rooth Station operated from 1911 to 1966, and a post office named Rooth operated from 1963 to 1966.

References

Settlements in New Brunswick
Communities in York County, New Brunswick